La Bombonera most commonly refers to Estadio Alberto J. Armando, home stadium of Boca Juniors in Argentina. Other stadiums or articles referred to as La Bombonera include:

Estadio Nemesio Díez, home stadium of Deportivo Toluca F.C. in Mexico
Estadio La Bombonera (Montevideo), home stadium of Basáñez in Uruguay
Ramón Sánchez Pizjuán Stadium, home stadium of Sevilla F.C. in Spain, colloquially called La Bombonera de Nervión
La Bombonera (San Juan), restaurant founded in 1902 in San Juan, Puerto Rico